Belartu (also Romanized as Belartū) is a village in Haram Rud-e Sofla Rural District, Samen District, Malayer County, Hamadan Province, Iran. At the 2006 census, its population was 434, in 101 families.

References 

Populated places in Malayer County